During the 1917–18 season Hibernian, a football club based in Edinburgh, finished sixteenth out of 18 clubs in the Scottish First Division.

Scottish First Division

Final League table

See also
List of Hibernian F.C. seasons

References

External links
Hibernian 1917/1918 results and fixtures, Soccerbase

Hibernian F.C. seasons
Hibernian